The Saint John River High Level Crossing is a steel girder bridge crossing the Saint John River at Coytown, New Brunswick, Canada.

Completed in 2001 and opened to the public in October 2002, the bridge carries 4 lanes of the realigned Route 2 (Trans-Canada Highway).  Total length is 1000 m (0.61 mile) with multiple spans resting on concrete piers.  The centre span is 120 m (400 ft) with an airdraft clearance of 60 m (200 ft) for navigational traffic.  It was built by the Maritime Road Development Corporation as part bg of a  toll highway project.

See also 
 List of bridges in Canada

References 

Bridges completed in 2001
Bridges over the Saint John River (Bay of Fundy)
Bridges on the Trans-Canada Highway
Buildings and structures in Queens County, New Brunswick
Transport in Queens County, New Brunswick
Steel bridges in Canada